Peter John Byrne (born July 24, 1951) is an American prelate of the Roman Catholic Church who has been serving as an auxiliary bishop of the Archdiocese of New York since 2014.

Biography

Early life 
Peter Byrne was born on July 24, 1951, in Manhattan, the son of John and Dorothy Byrne. He grew up in Stuyvesant Town in Manhattan and attended Immaculate Conception School Elementary School in Manhattan and Cardinal Hayes High School in the Bronx.  Bryne earned a bachelor's degree from Fordham University in New York City in history and social studies. In 1974, Byrne entered St. Joseph's Seminary in Yonkers, New York.  However, he soon left to teach at Catholic schools and confirm that he wanted to become a priest. In 1983, Byrne returned to the seminary and completed the program there.

Priesthood 
Byrne was ordained a priest for the Archdiocese of New York by Cardinal John O'Connor on December 1, 1984. His pastoral assignments included parochial vicar at St. Teresa of Avila Parish in Sleepy Hollow, New York from 1984 to 1992, administrator of St. Thomas Aquinas Parish in the Bronx from 1992 to 1994 and administrator at St. John the Baptist de La Salle Parish in Staten Island, New York, in 1995.

Byrne then served as pastor at Immaculate Conception Parish on Staten Island from 1995 to 2013.  After the attacks on the World Trade Center on September 11, 2001, Byrne worked for several weeks with families that lost relatives there.  Byrne served at St. Elizabeth's Parish in Washington Heights, Manhattan from 2013 to 2014.

Auxiliary Bishop of New York
Byrne was named the titular bishop of Cluain Iraird and auxiliary bishop of the Archdiocese of New York by Pope Francis on June 14, 2014. He was consecrated a bishop by Cardinal Timothy Dolan in St. Patrick's Cathedral in Manhattan on August 4, 2014. New York auxiliary bishops Gerald Walsh and Dominick Lagonegro were the co-consecrators. Byrne chose as his episcopal motto "God is Faithful".

See also

 Catholic Church hierarchy
 Catholic Church in the United States
 Historical list of the Catholic bishops of the United States
 List of Catholic bishops of the United States
 Lists of patriarchs, archbishops, and bishops

References

External links

Episcopal succession

 

1951 births
Living people
People from Manhattan
Fordham University alumni
Saint Joseph's Seminary (Dunwoodie) alumni
People of the Roman Catholic Archdiocese of New York
21st-century American Roman Catholic titular bishops
Catholics from New York (state)
Bishops appointed by Pope Francis